The Cors-Air M25Y Black Devil is an Italian aircraft engine, designed and produced by Cors-Air of Barco di Bibbiano for use in powered parachutes and very small ultralight trikes flown by heavy pilots.

Design and development
The M25Y is a single-cylinder two-stroke,  displacement, air-cooled, gasoline engine design, with a poly V belt reduction drive. The reduction drive has optional reduction ratios of 2.2:1, 2.3:1, 2.5:1, 2.6:1, 2.7:1 and 2.88:1. The M25Y employs a single capacitor discharge ignition, a WB37 diaphragm carburettor and produces  at 7900 rpm. The weight is  including the exhaust system.

The engine has a centrifugal clutch that stops the propeller spinning when the engine is operated at low RPM, a safety feature for use in powered paraglider applications.

Applications
Aeros ANT
Aerola Alatus

Specifications (M25Y Black Devil)

See also

References

External links

Cors-Air aircraft engines
Two-stroke aircraft piston engines
Air-cooled aircraft piston engines
2000s aircraft piston engines